Simrat Kaur is an Indian actress.She primarily works in Telugu films. Simrat hails from Mumbai and is born in a Punjabi family.

Career 
Simrat made her acting debut in Rishi's telugu romantic drama film Prematho Mee Karthik in 2017 starring opposite Kartikeya Gummakonda.  In 2018, she acted in Parichayam and Soni. In 2019, she was chosen as the female lead for telugu romantic thriller Dirty Hari, starring alongside Shravan Reddy in the Indian adaptation of Match Point.

She was featured in Punjabi music videos like Burj Khalifa and Laara Lappa by Himanth Sandhu. In 2021, she has featured in the Mika Singh Tere Bin Zindagi romantic song.

In 2022 she got a chance to act in a cameo role of Nagarjuna's Bangarraju.

Filmography

References

External links 

 
 

Living people
Actresses in Telugu cinema
Actresses in Hindi cinema
Year of birth missing (living people)
21st-century Indian actresses